George Henry Weiss (1898–1946) was an American poet, writer and novelist.  His science fiction stories and poetry appeared under the pseudonym "Francis Flagg" in the magazines Amazing Stories, Astounding, Tales of Wonder, Weird Tales and others.  His novel The Night People was published by Fantasy Publishing Company, Inc. in 1947.

Bibliography

Short stories
The Machine Man of Ardathia, Amazing Stories, November 1927.
The Mentanicals, Amazing Stories, April 1934.
Earth's Lucky Day (with Forrest J. Ackerman), Wonder Stories, March 1936.
The Seeds of the Toc-Toc Birds
The Heads of Apex

Novels

The Night People (1947)

References

External links

 
 
 
 

1898 births
1946 deaths
American male novelists
American science fiction writers
American male poets
American male short story writers
Writers from Halifax, Nova Scotia
20th-century American short story writers
20th-century American poets
20th-century American male writers
20th-century American novelists
Place of death missing